Yuriy Mykolayoyvch Stepanyuk (born 3 March 1983) is a Ukrainian footballer.

Career 
Stepanyuk began his career in 2001 in the Ukrainian Second League with Ros Bila Tserkva. In 2007, he signed with FC Arsenal Bila Tserkva, and won promotion to the Ukrainian First League in 2008. After four seasons in the First League he returned to the Second League with FC Desna Chernihiv. In 2012, he played with FC UkrAhroKom Holovkivka and later with Arsenal-Kyivshchyna Bila Tserkva. He went abroad in 2017 to play in the Canadian Soccer League with FC Vorkuta. He recorded his first goal for Vorkuta on June 9, 2017 against Serbian White Eagles FC.

References 

1983 births
Living people
Ukrainian footballers
FC Ros Bila Tserkva players
FC Arsenal-Kyivshchyna Bila Tserkva players
FC Desna Chernihiv players
FC UkrAhroKom Holovkivka players
FC Continentals players
Canadian Soccer League (1998–present) players
Association football midfielders
Ukrainian First League players
Ukrainian Second League players